Muenster is a village in the Canadian province of Saskatchewan within the Rural Municipality of St. Peter No. 369 and Census Division No. 15. Muenster is named after the city of Münster, Germany.

History 

Muenster incorporated as a town on August 18, 1908.

St. Peter's Abbey began in 1903 with the arrival of seven Benedictine monks.

In 1921 St. Peter's Abbey became the Territorial Abbey of Saint Peter-Muenster. The abbot's duties were similar to that of a bishop of a diocese. The Territorial Abbey was suppressed in 1998 to become part of the Roman Catholic Diocese of Saskatoon.

The historic territory of the abbey was also referred to as St. Peter's Colony. The villages and parishes in St. Peter's Colony included: St. Peter's monastery and parish at Muenster, St. Boniface (Leofeld), Englefeld, Annaheim, Bruno, St. Joseph (Old Fulda), Marysburg, Humboldt, Lake Lenore, St. John Baptist (Willmont), Watson, St. Martin, St. Scholastico, St. Patrick's, St. Oswald Immaculate Conception. Dana, St. Gregor, St. Bernard (Old Pilger), St. Leo (St. Meinrad), St. Gertrude, Carmel, Peterson, Cudworth, Naicam, Holy Family Mission, St. Benedict, Pilger, St. James, and Middle Lake.

The majority of the early settlers in the region were German speaking Roman Catholics from the United States.

In 1938, a German-language newspaper published in Muenster, St. Peter's Bode, was "banned from Germany by order of Heinrich Himmler, chief of the National police." The paper's editor, Reverend Father Peters, responded: "All we did was print the facts. We carried little editorial content or criticism on German affairs."

Climate

Demographics 

Education 
Muenster is home to St. Peter's College, an affiliate of the University of Saskatchewan. It was founded by the Benedictine monks of St. Peter's Abbey in 1921. The college offers a full first year of Arts and Sciences classes and senior classes in several disciplines. Annual full-time enrollment is limited to 150 students.

Muenster landmarks 

St. Peter's Cathedral features paintings and murals by the artist Berthold Imhoff
 The skyline of Muenster is mainly defined by the steeples of St. Peter's College and Abbey
 Muenster Hill is a popular local tobogganing destination
 St. Peter's College library is the third largest book repository in Saskatchewan
 Wolverine Creek runs through Muenster, past St. Peter's College and Abbey

Events 
St. Peter's Abbey is host to the annual Junior and Teen Choir Camps of the Saskatchewan Choral Federation.

Sports 
Muenster was home to the Muenster Red Sox, a senior baseball team. The Red Sox played in the North Central Baseball League from 1964–2003 and have in the Saskatoon Senior League until 2009. The Muenster Midget AAA Red Sox currently compete in the Saskatchewan Premier Baseball League, capturing the provincial title in 2016 and winning a bronze medal at nationals that same year. The community is also active in hockey and soccer.

Notables 
Notable persons who were born, grew up in or established their fame in Muenster, Saskatchewan:
 Ralph Klassen, professional ice hockey centre/left wing
 Logan Hofmann, professional baseball highest ever Saskatchewan-born MLB draft pick, being selected in the 5th Round of the 2020 MLB draft.

See also
Territorial abbey
St. Peter's Abbey, Saskatchewan

References

External links
 Village of Muenster website
 St. Peter's College
 St. Peter's Community
 Muenster Village Council
 Territorial Abbey of Saint Peter-Muenster
 St. Peter's Abbey website

Villages in Saskatchewan
St. Peter No. 369, Saskatchewan
Division No. 15, Saskatchewan